is a railway station on the Iida Line in Tenryū-ku, Hamamatsu, Shizuoka Prefecture, Japan, operated by Central Japan Railway Company (JR Central).

Lines
Urakawa Station is served by the Iida Line and is 57.3 kilometers from the starting point of the line at Toyohashi Station.

Station layout
The station has one ground-level island platform connected to the station building by a level crossing. The station is unattended.

Platforms

Adjacent stations

Station History
Urakawa Station was established on November 11, 1934, as a station on the now defunct Sanshin Railway. On August 1, 1943, the Sanshin Railway was nationalized along with several other local lines to form the Iida line. Scheduled freight services were discontinued from 1980. Along with its division and privatization of JNR on April 1, 1987, the station came under the control and operation of the Central Japan Railway Company. The station has been unmanned since 1991.

Passenger statistics
In fiscal 2017, the station was used by an average of 60 passengers daily (boarding passengers only).

Surrounding area

Urakawa Elementary School

See also
 List of railway stations in Japan

References

External links

  Iida Line station information	

Stations of Central Japan Railway Company
Iida Line
Railway stations in Japan opened in 1934
Railway stations in Shizuoka Prefecture
Railway stations in Hamamatsu